The John F. Ross Collegiate Vocational Institute is a grade 9–12 public secondary school in Guelph, Ontario, Canada and is part of the Upper Grand District School Board.

History

Guelph's largest high school was originally named John F. Ross Vocational School, in honour of John Francis Ross, a highly respected Guelph educator and principal. The school opened its doors in 1956 to 460 students with 25 teachers and Lorne Fox as its principal, under the new name John F. Ross Collegiate Vocational Institute. It celebrated its 50th anniversary with a reunion in May 2006.

Academic programs
It is the only high school in the Upper Grand District School Board that offers French Immersion and English as Second Language program (grades 9–12). In addition, Ross offers programs in business, technology, drama, music, art, science, social sciences and co-op. As part of its standard classes, the school also offers special education classes for exceptional students. Ross also has a co-operative learning program in which local employers are matched with students for on-the-job training.

Students also have opportunities to learn outside of the school. For example, the Music and Geography departments offer an extended field trip to a major city or destination (i.e., New York City, Chicago, Washington, D.C. and Boston) each spring. Annual March Break trips are offered to students as well. Recent trips offered include China in 2011, Eastern Europe in 2011, Africa (Me to We), Greece and Turkey in 2012, France in 2013, and Italy, Switzerland and Austria in March 2014.

The school has the largest population of any school in the Upper Grand District School Board, with an estimated 2000 students (Fall 2014). This is due to its proximity to the downtown core as well as drawing in many students from the surrounding rural areas including nearby towns such as Rockwood.

Sports
The school always had a fierce athletic rivalry with the Centennial Spartans.  In 2006, the women's rugby team competed at OFSAA and clinched a 3rd place. In 2006 and 2008, the boys' baseball team was eliminated in the semi-finals in a game that needed extra innings against St. Michael's College School, and a loss to the eventual 2008 OFSAA champions Notre Dame Irish, respectively. In 2007, the boys' hockey team,  won the OFSAA Championship in Whitby, Ontario.

In the fall of 2009 the Royals defeated the Guelph Collegiate Gaels in District 10 football action to win city championship 13–7, their first title, in 11 years. The Ross football team had gone 0–15 in the regular season of 2010 before losing to the Centennial Spartans at home in the D10 Quarter-Finals. In the 2011 season; the Royals beat the Lourdes Crusaders,  24–7 on November 11, 2011. They had their third straight losing season with a 33–7 loss to the Our Lady of Lourdes Crusader.

Ross's Junior Boys' basketball team lost the 2011 District 10 City Championship to Orangeville Bears in a lopsided affair, before advanced to CWOSSA and losing in round Robin to St. Mary's of Kitchener. The Senior Boys' Basketball team lost in the District 10 quarter-final game to the Orangeville Bears. They advanced to CWOSSA and the Final before losing to St. Mary's of Kitchener. They did advance to OFSAA with a second-place finish.

Track and Field 
The Ross Royals track and field team has had an ongoing tradition of success rich with records and OFSAA medals since the early 1970s. The school records held at John F. Ross contain many of the top performances in District 10 history.

1970's 
Some of the earliest instances of major success still on record comes from athletes Barb Becker, Chris Laubach, Dave Rouleau, John Elkerton, Lori Mckay, and John Settle. Throughout their high school career the six of them alone amassed a staggering 17 OFSAA medals and 5 OFSAA titles between 1973 and 1978. These provincial champions were accompanied by many other talented athletes that made up the 1970s "powerhouse" team led by coaches Donald Ranson and Don Sykes. Over 40 years later the athletes of that era still hold 27 school records. Rouleau even managed to claim the OFSAA record in the midget boys’ high jump in 1973 with a jump of 6' 2¼" (1.886m).

Rouleau decided on a unique combination of events as he continued to train and excel at both the high jump and the 400m. He won four medals all together and continues to hold school records in both events. Settle finished his amazing career with a total of 4 OFSAA medals across the 800m and 1500m as well as 6 school records, all of which are still unbeaten as of 2019. In his freshman year Settle achieved a double gold medal performance in the middle-distance events. Becker was a throws specialist who claimed the OFSAA title in the junior girls' shot put as well as winning three other medals in her career. In 1978, Laubach's OFSAA gold medal in the shot put became the school's last provincial title in a field event until 2018.

1980's 
The John F. Ross track and field team continued to thrive off their momentum throughout the early 1980s. As the team saw the last of the 1970s champions graduate, new athletes were showing promising talent, especially in the sprints. In 1980 the team achieved its first ever OFSAA gold medal in a relay event. The women's 4 × 400 m title was won in a time of 3:57.2, the school's third fastest time to this day. In the following year at the 1981 OFSAA championships the girls defended their title with the same four runners. Their finishing time of 3:56.04 became a school record that still stands as of 2019.

1990's 
In the 1990s two distance runners took a shot at the record board. The first to come was D. Graham who twice won the OFSAA bronze medal in the midget and junior 3000m. Graham currently owns the school record in the 3000m in all three age categories. In 1996 a newcomer to the team named C. Briante won John F. Ross' first OFSAA title since the women's 4 × 400 m gold in 1981. Her OFSAA winning 1500m time of 4:46.43 was held as the school record for 11 years until June 2017. Briante went on to take the junior records for the 1500m and 3000m which remain unbeaten.

2000's 
At the turn of the new millennium the Ross Royals saw another resurgence of major success in the form of freshman sprinter, Emily Johnson. In 2002 Johnson proved to be the strongest sprinter in Ross' history setting midget girls' school records in the 100m and 200m. She then went on to win the 200m title in and broke the OFSAA record with a time of 24.42 which stood for 8 years. In Johnson's junior season she achieved the coveted 100m/200m double OFSAA gold. In 2004 Johnson won a bronze medal in the senior 200m and newcomer Guyson Kuruneri sets school records in the senior men's 100m, 200m, and long jump. Following his high school career, Kuruneri competed for the Guelph Gryphons where he later became the head jumps coach for the university's 36 time national championship winning team.

2010-present 
The new decade began with an OFSAA bronze medal in the senior women's 4 × 100 m relay. The team finished with a school record time of 48.57. In following two years (2011 and 2012), 400m runner Alison Fraser attained an OFSAA silver and bronze medal in the event. While 2013 saw no medals in the individual events, Fraser assisted the 4 × 400 m relay team to a silver medal at OFSAA finishing in the school's second fastest ever time of 3:56.53. In 2014, freshman athlete Adam Lee joined the team and picked up a multitude of events spanning the sprints, jumps, throws, and hurdles. Throughout his career Lee amassed 10 school records, most notable of which being a 7.20m (23' 8") long jump and a 2.00m (6' 6¾") high jump. Lee achieved an OFSAA bronze medal in the long jump as a freshman and capped off his final high school season by becoming 2018's OFSAA champion in the senior division of the long jump. This win was the school's first OFSAA title in a field event since Chris Laubach's shot put title almost exactly 40 years prior in 1978. In 2016, Spanish exchange student Bruno Comín joined the team for the year. Similarly to Lee, he was also proficient in many events, however he decided to focus on the high jump, javelin and pole vault for the season. Comín and Lee are both winners of the CWOSSA overall champion award achieved by winning gold in all three of the athlete's individual events at the meet. Comín qualified to OFSAA in all three events, won silver medal in the pole vault, and claimed the school record for both the pole vault and javelin. In the fall of 2017, newcomer Haley Davis immediately caught the attention of coaches by winning an OFSAA gold medal in the cross country season. As of February 2019 after only two seasons, she has won 5 OFSAA medals between cross country, 1500m, and 800m. This makes Davis already one of the most decorated athletes in the Ross' history.

Records 

Midget Girls

Junior Girls

Senior Women

Midget Boys

Junior Boys

Senior Men

OFSAA

Swimming: 
100 Metre Backstroke- open girls:
2013-Emma Ball: 1:02.10 R
2014-Emma Ball: 1:02.67

200 Metre Individual Medley- open girls:
2015-Sophia Papadedes: 2:22.85

Girl's SWAD 100 Metre Freestyle:
2012-Alicia Denoon: 1:15.09
2013-Alicia Denoon: 1:16.23

District 10: Swimming
2012-13

OFSAA 
Girl's Rugby
2016

District 10: Baseball

2016-17

2015-16

District 10: Basketball (Senior Girls)

2015-16

District 10: Field Hockey

2017-18

2016-17

District 10: Football

2019-20

2013-14

2012-13

District 10: Golf

2015-16

2013-14

District 10: Rugby

Senior Girls:

2016-17

2015-16

2014-15

2013-14

2012-13

Junior Boys:

2016-17

2015-16

2014-15

2013-14

2012-13

Senior Boys:

2014-15

2013-14

District 10: Soccer

Senior Girls:

2016-17

Junior Boys:

2014-15

2013-14

Senior Boys:

2016-17

2014-15

District 10: Volleyball

Junior Girls:

2012-13

Senior Girls:

2013-14

Junior Boys:

2014-15

Extracurricular activities and clubs 

 All Board Permitted Sports
 Arts Council
 Athletic Council
AP English Club 
AP French
 Band & Choir Jr and Sr
 Battle of the Bands
Best Buddies
Book Club
Business Club
Canadian Open Math Challenge
Chemistry Club
 Christians In Action
 Concert Band 
 Concert Choir 
 Debating Club
 Doctor Who Club
 ECO Team 
 E.L. Fox Stage Crew
 Equity Council
 Fine Arts Club 
 Improv Club
 Multicultural Festival
Robotics Club
 RSB - DECA Chapter 
 Save The Future
 Students' Council
 Royal Jazz 
 Royal Rhythm
 Sidekicks 
 Trivia Club
 Youth Alpha

Volunteerism
Each spring, up to four families of mallard ducks fly to the school, where they have a safe environment to raise their young. Eventually, the school's Environment Club relocates the ducks and ducklings to nearby wildlife preserves. The school looks after the birds' surroundings. Over the years John F. Ross has donated tens of thousands of dollars to charity.

During the 2008–2009 school year, the school took part in the Spread the Net challenge promoted by Rick Mercer. By the end of the competition the school had raised more than $55,000 to help fight malaria, the highest total in Canada for any school. As a result, the famous comedian visited the school in March 2009 and John F. Ross was featured on Mercer's television show, the Rick Mercer Report. The school took part in the campaign once again in 2015 raising over $41,000 for the Spread the Net Challenge. Rick Mercer once again visited the school and congratulated John F. Ross on raising over $100 000 total for the charity over the years.

On a smaller scale, the students' council runs an annual fundraising event called F.R.O.S.T.Y. (Friendly Royals Offering Stuff To Yuletide) in December. For two weeks, classes set up events such as bake sales, video game parties, or a chance to slime a teacher, all to raise money for local nonprofit organizations and charities. There is also a weekly "Save the Future" collection that brings in a few hundred dollars every week toward a variety of good causes.

Notable alumni
 Actress Neve Campbell (1973-
 Actor Noah Danby (1974-
 Actor Shaun Benson (1974-
 Journalist David Akin
 Olympian Billy Bridges
 Athlete / Coach Michael Faulds

See also
List of high schools in Ontario
Upper Grand District School Board (UGDSB)

References

External links
John F. Ross C.V.I. website
John F. Ross 50th anniversary reunion website
Wellington Guelph Community Portal
Upper Grand District School Board Website

High schools in Guelph
1956 establishments in Ontario
Educational institutions established in 1956